The Gulf Road is a long stretch of road along the coast of Kuwait City that starts at Jahrah and ends south at Messila, where it joins the Sixth Ring Road. Another stretch actually called the Coastal Road, from Fintas to Fahaheel is also sometimes called the Gulf Road. Landmarks located alongside the road include the Kuwait Towers, in Kuwait City and the Kuwait Scientific Center in Salmiya.

Roads in Kuwait